The Cayman Islands is a self-governing British Overseas Territory, and the largest by population. The  territory comprises the three islands of Grand Cayman, Cayman Brac and Little Cayman, which are located to the south of Cuba and northeast of Honduras, between Jamaica and Mexico's Yucatán Peninsula. The capital city is George Town on Grand Cayman, which is the most populous of the three islands.

The Cayman Islands is considered to be part of the geographic Western Caribbean Zone as well as the Greater Antilles. The territory is a major world offshore financial centre for international businesses and wealthy individuals, largely as a result of the state not charging taxes on any income earned or stored.

With a GDP per capita of $91,392, the Cayman Islands has the highest standard of living in the Caribbean. Immigrants from over 130 countries and territories reside in the Cayman Islands.

History 

No evidence of an indigenous people has been found on the Cayman Islands. It is believed that they were discovered by Christopher Columbus on 10 May 1503 during his final voyage to the Americas. He named them 'Las Tortugas' after the large number of turtles found there (which were soon hunted to near-extinction); however, in the succeeding decades the islands began to be referred to as Caimanas or Caymanes, after the caimans present there. No immediate colonisation followed Columbus's discovery, but a variety of settlers from various backgrounds eventually came, including pirates, shipwrecked sailors, and deserters from Oliver Cromwell's army in Jamaica. Sir Francis Drake briefly visited the islands in 1586.

The first recorded permanent inhabitant, Isaac Bodden, was born on Grand Cayman around 1661. He was the grandson of an original settler named Bodden, probably one of Oliver Cromwell's soldiers at the taking of Jamaica in 1655.

England took formal control of the Cayman Islands, along with Jamaica, as a result of the Treaty of Madrid of 1670. That same year saw an attack on a turtle fishing settlement on Little Cayman by the Spanish under Manuel Ribeiro Pardal. Following several unsuccessful attempts at settlement in what had by now become a haven for pirates, a permanent English-speaking population in the islands dates from the 1730s. With settlement, after the first royal land grant by the Governor of Jamaica in 1734, came the perceived need for slaves. Many were brought to the islands from Africa; this is evident today with the majority of native Caymanians being of African and/or English descent. The results of the first census taken in the islands in 1802 showed the population on Grand Cayman to be 933, with 545 of those inhabitants being enslaved. Slavery was abolished in the Cayman Islands in 1833. At the time of abolition, there were over 950 people of African ancestry enslaved by 116 families.

On 22 June 1863, the Cayman Islands became officially declared and administered as a dependency of the Crown Colony of Jamaica. The islands continued to be governed as part of the Colony of Jamaica until 1962 when they became a separate Crown colony while Jamaica became an independent Commonwealth realm. 

On 8 February 1794, the Caymanians rescued the crews of a group of ten merchant ships, including HMS Convert, an incident that has since become known as the Wreck of the Ten Sail. The ships had struck a reef and run aground during rough seas. Legend has it that King George III rewarded the island with a promise never to introduce taxes as compensation for their generosity, as one of the ships carried a member of the King's own family. While this remains a popular legend, the story is not true.

In the 1950s, tourism began to take off with the opening of Owen Roberts International Airport (ORIA) in 1952, a bank and several hotels, plus a number of scheduled flights and cruise stop-overs. Politically the Cayman Islands were an internally self-governing territory of Jamaica from 1958 to 1962; however, they reverted to direct British rule following the independence of Jamaica in 1962. In 1972, a large degree of internal autonomy was granted by a new constitution, with further revisions being made in 1994. The Cayman Islands government focused on boosting the territory's economy via tourism and off-shore finance, both of which mushroomed from the 1970s onwards. The Cayman Islands have historically been a tax-exempt destination, and the government has always relied on indirect and not direct taxes. The territory has never levied income tax, capital gains tax, or any wealth tax, making them a popular tax haven.

The constitution was further modified in 2001 and 2009, codifying various aspects of human rights legislation.

On 11 September 2004 the island of Grand Cayman, which lies largely unprotected at sea level, was hit by Hurricane Ivan, creating an  storm surge which flooded many areas of Grand Cayman. An estimated 83% of the dwellings on the island were damaged including 4% requiring complete reconstruction. A reported 70% of all dwellings suffered severe damage from flooding or wind. Another 26% sustained minor damage from partial roof removal, low levels of flooding, or impact with floating or wind-driven hurricane debris. Power, water and communications were disrupted for months in some areas as Ivan was the worst hurricane to hit the islands in 86 years. Grand Cayman began a major rebuilding process and within two years its infrastructure was nearly returned to pre-hurricane status. Due to the tropical location of the islands, more hurricanes or tropical systems have affected the Cayman Islands than any other region in the Atlantic basin; it has been brushed or directly hit, on average, every 2.23 years.

Geography 

The islands are in the western Caribbean Sea and are the peaks of an undersea mountain range called the Cayman Ridge (or Cayman Rise). The islands lie in the northwest of the Caribbean Sea, east of Quintana Roo, Mexico and Yucatán State, Mexico, northeast of Costa Rica, north of Panama, south of Cuba and west of Jamaica. The nearest land mass from Grand Cayman is the Canarreos Archipelago (about 240 km or 150 miles away), whereas the nearest from the easternmost island Cayman Brac is the Jardines de la Reina archipelago (about 160 km or 100 miles away) – both of which are part of Cuba.

All three islands were formed by large coral heads covering submerged ice-age peaks of western extensions of the Cuban Sierra Maestra range and are mostly flat.

The terrain is mostly a low-lying limestone base surrounded by coral reefs. The portions of prehistoric coral reef that line the coastline and protrude from the water are referred to as ironshore.

Fauna

The mammalian species in the Cayman Islands include the introduced Central American agouti and eight species of bats. At least three now extinct native rodent species were present until the discovery of the islands by Europeans. Marine life around the island of the Grand Cayman includes tarpon, silversides (Atheriniformes), French angelfish (Pomacanthus paru), and giant barrel sponges. A number of cetaceans are found in offshore waters. These species include the goose-beaked whale (Ziphius cavirostris), Blainville's beaked whale (Mesoplodon densirostris) and sperm whale (Physeter macrocephalus).

Cayman avian fauna includes two endemic subspecies of Amazona parrots: Amazona leucocephala hesterna or Cuban amazon, presently restricted to the island of Cayman Brac, but formerly also on Little Cayman, and Amazona leucocephala caymanensis or Grand Cayman parrot, which is native to the Cayman Islands, forested areas of Cuba, and the Isla de la Juventud. Little Cayman and Cayman Brac are also home to red-footed and brown boobies. Although the barn owl (Tyto alba) occurs in all three of the islands they are not commonplace. The Cayman Islands also possess five endemic subspecies of butterflies. These butterfly breeds can be viewed at the Queen Elizabeth II Botanic Park on the Grand Cayman.

Among other notable fauna at the Queen Elizabeth II Botanic Park is the critically threatened blue iguana which is also known as the Grand Cayman iguana (Cyclura lewisi). The blue iguana is endemic to the Grand Cayman particularly because of rocky, sunlit, open areas near the island's shores that are advantageous for the laying of eggs. Nevertheless, habitat destruction and invasive mammalian predators remain the primary reasons that blue iguana hatchlings do not survive naturally.

The Cuban crocodile (Crocodylus rhombifer) once inhabited the islands. The name "Cayman" is derived from a Carib word for various crocodilians.

Climate

The Cayman Islands has a tropical wet and dry climate, with a wet season from May to October, and a dry season that runs from November to April. Seasonally, there is little temperature change.

A major natural hazard is the tropical cyclones that form during the Atlantic hurricane season from June to November.

On 11 and 12 September 2004, Hurricane Ivan struck the Cayman Islands. The storm resulted in two deaths and caused significant damage to the infrastructure on the islands. The total economic impact of the storms was estimated to be $3.4 billion.

Demographics 

According to the Economics and Statistics Office of the Government of the Cayman Islands, the Cayman Islands had a population of 78,554 as of fall 2022. It was revealed in the 2021 census that 56% of the workforce is Non-Caymanian; this is the first time in the territory's history that the number of working immigrants has overtaken the number of working Caymanians. Most Caymanians are of mixed African and European ancestry. Slavery was not common throughout the islands, and once it was abolished, communities seemed to integrate more compliantly than other Caribbean nations and territories, resulting in a more mixed-race population.

The country's demographics are changing rapidly. Immigration plays a huge role, however, the changing demographics in age have sounded alarm bells in the most recent census. In comparison to the 2010 census, the 2021 census has shown that 36% of Cayman's population growth has been in seniors over the age of 65, while only 8% growth was recorded in groups under 15 years of age. This is due to extremely low birth rates among Caymanians, which almost forces the government to have to seek out workers from overseas to sustain the country's economic success. This has raised concerns, however, among many young Caymanians, who worry about the workforce becoming increasingly competitive with the influx of workers, as well as rent and property prices going up.

Because the population has skyrocketed over the last decade, the Premier of the Cayman Islands, Wayne Panton, has stressed that the islands need more careful and managed growth. Many have worried that the country's infrastructure and services cannot cope with the surging population.

District populations

According to a 2022 population report by the Cayman Islands Government, the estimated population is 78,554, however, the permanent resident population is 71,105, broken down as follows:

George Town: 34,921
West Bay: 15,335
Bodden Town: 14,845
North Side: 1,902
East End: 1,846
Cayman Brac and Little Cayman (Sister Islands): 2,257

Demographics & immigration
According to the Cayman Islands Spring 2022 Labour Force report, 48.9% of the country is Caymanian. This includes generational Caymanians and those who have obtained Caymanian status (term used for citizenship). The remaining 51.1% are immigrants on work permits, or those with permanent residency, which is a pathway to gaining status. The Cayman Islands has long been a popular destination for expatriates, dating back to the late 1970s when the country's financial sector started to take off.

Religion
The predominant religion on the Cayman Islands is Christianity (66.9%, down from over 80% in 2010). Religions practised include United Church, Church of God, Anglican Church, Baptist Church, Catholic Church, Seventh-day Adventist Church, and Pentecostal Church. Roman Catholic churches are St. Ignatius Church, George Town, Christ the Redeemer Church, West Bay and Stella Maris Church, Cayman Brac. Many citizens are deeply religious, regularly going to church, however, atheism has been on the rise throughout the islands since 2000, with 16.7% now identifying with no religion, according to the 2021 census. Ports are closed on Sundays and Christian holidays. There is also an active synagogue and Jewish community on the island as well as places of worship in George Town for Jehovah's Witnesses and followers of the Bahá'í faith.

In 2020, there are an estimated 121 muslims in Cayman Islands.

Languages
The official language of the Cayman Islands is English (90%). Islanders' accents retain elements passed down from English, Scottish, and Welsh settlers (among others) in a language variety known as Cayman Creole. Caymanians of Jamaican origin speak in their own vernacular (see Jamaican Creole and Jamaican English). It is also quite commonplace to hear some residents converse in Spanish as many citizens have relocated from Latin America to work and live on Grand Cayman. The Latin American nations with the greatest representation are Honduras, Cuba, Colombia, Nicaragua, and the Dominican Republic. Spanish speakers comprise approximately between 10 and 12% of the population and are predominantly of the Caribbean dialect. Tagalog is spoken by about 5% of inhabitants most of whom are Filipino residents on work permits.

Economy 

The economy of the Cayman Islands is dominated by financial services and tourism, together accounting for 50-60% of Gross Domestic Product. The nation's low tax rates have led to it being used as a tax haven for corporations; there are 100,000 companies registered in the Cayman Islands, more than the population itself. The Cayman Islands have come under criticism for allegations of money laundering and other financial crimes, including a 2016 statement by former US president Barack Obama that described a particular building which was the registered address of over 12,000 corporations as a "tax scam".

The Cayman Islands holds a relatively low unemployment rate of about 4.24% as of 2015, lower than the value of 4.7% that was recorded in 2014.

With an average income of US$71,549, Caymanians have the highest standard of living in the Caribbean. According to the CIA World Factbook, the Cayman Islands' real GDP per capita is the tenth highest in the world, but the CIA's data for Cayman dates to 2018 and is likely to be lower than present-day values. The territory prints its own currency, the Cayman Islands dollar (KYD), which is pegged to the US dollar US$1.227 to 1 KYD. However, in many retail stores throughout the islands, the KYD is typically traded at US$1.25.

Cayman Islands have a high cost of living, even when compared to UK and US. For example, a loaf of multigrain bread is $5.49 (KYD), while a similar loaf sells for $2.47 (KYD) in the US and $1.36 (KYD) in the UK.

The minimum wage (as of February 2021) is $6 KYD for standard positions, and $4.50 for workers in the service industry, where tips supplement income. This contributes to wealth disparity. A small segment of the population lives in condemned properties lacking power and running water.

The government has established a Needs Assessment Unit to relieve poverty in the islands. Local charities, including Cayman's Acts of Random Kindness (ARK) also provide assistance.

The government's primary source of income is indirect taxation: there is no income tax, capital gains tax, or corporation tax. An import duty of 5% to 22% (automobiles 29.5% to 100%) is levied against goods imported into the islands. Few goods are exempt; notable exemptions include books, cameras, gold, and perfume.

Tourism

One of Grand Cayman's main attractions is Seven Mile Beach, site of a number of the island's hotels and resorts. Named one of the Ultimate Beaches by Caribbean Travel and Life, Seven Mile Beach (due to erosion over the years, the number has decreased to 5.5 miles) is a public beach on the western shore of Grand Cayman Island. Historical sites in Grand Cayman, such as Pedro St. James Castle in Savannah, also attract visitors. 
All three islands offer scuba diving, and the Cayman Islands are home to several snorkelling locations where tourists can swim with stingrays. The most popular area to do this is Stingray City, Grand Cayman. Stingray City is a top attraction in Grand Cayman and originally started in the 1980s when divers started feeding squid to stingrays. The stingrays started to associate the sound of the boat motors with food, and thus visit this area year-round.

There are two shipwrecks off the shores of Cayman Brac, including the MV Captain Keith Tibbetts; Grand Cayman also has several shipwrecks off its shores, including one deliberate one. In November 2008 her ownership was transferred for an undisclosed amount to the government of the Cayman Islands, which had decided to sink the Kittiwake in June 2009 to form a new artificial reef off Seven Mile Beach, Grand Cayman. Following several delays, the ship was finally scuttled according to plan on 5 January 2011. The Kittiwake has become a dynamic environment for marine life. While visitors are not allowed to take anything, there are endless sights. Each of the five decks of the ship offers squirrelfish, rare sponges, Goliath groupers, urchins, and more. Experienced and beginner divers are invited to swim around the Kittiwake. Pirates Week is an annual 11-day November festival started in 1977 by the then-Minister of Tourism Jim Bodden to boost tourism during the country's tourism slow season.

Other Grand Cayman tourist attractions include the ironshore landscape of Hell; the  marine theme park "Cayman Turtle Centre: Island Wildlife Encounter", previously known as "Boatswain's Beach"; the production of gourmet sea salt; and the Mastic Trail, a hiking trail through the forests in the centre of the island. The National Trust for the Cayman Islands provides guided tours weekly on the Mastic Trail and other locations.

Another attraction to visit on Grand Cayman is the Observation Tower, located in Camana Bay. The Observation Tower is 75 feet tall and provides 360-degree views across Seven Mile Beach, George Town, the North Sound, and beyond. It is free to the public and climbing the tower has become a popular thing to do in the Cayman Islands.

Points of interest include the East End Light (sometimes called Gorling Bluff Light), a lighthouse at the east end of Grand Cayman island. The lighthouse is the centrepiece of East End Lighthouse Park, managed by the National Trust for the Cayman Islands; the first navigational aid on the site was the first lighthouse in the Cayman Islands.

Shipping
, 360 commercial vessels and 1,674 pleasure craft were registered in the Cayman Islands totalling 4.3 million GT.

Labour
The Cayman Islands has a population of 69,656 and therefore a limited workforce. Work permits may, therefore, be granted to foreigners. On average, there have been more than 24,000+ foreigners holding valid work permits.

Work permits for non-citizens
To work in the Cayman Islands as a non-citizen, a work permit is required. This involves passing a police background check and a health check. A prospective immigrant worker will not be granted a permit unless certain medical conditions are met, including testing negative for syphilis and HIV. A permit may be granted to individuals on special work.

A foreigner must first have a job to move to the Cayman Islands. The employer applies and pays for the work permit. Work permits are not granted to foreigners who are in the Cayman Islands (unless it is a renewal). The Cayman Islands Immigration Department requires foreigners to remain out of the country until their work permit has been approved.

The Cayman Islands presently imposes a controversial "rollover" in relation to expatriate workers who require a work permit. Non-Caymanians are only permitted to reside and work within the territory for a maximum of nine years unless they satisfy the criteria of key employees. Non-Caymanians who are "rolled over" may return to work for additional nine-year periods, subject to a one-year gap between their periods of work. The policy has been the subject of some controversy within the press. Law firms have been particularly upset by the recruitment difficulties that it has caused. Other less well-remunerated employment sectors have been affected as well. Concerns about safety have been expressed by diving instructors, and realtors have also expressed concerns. Others support the rollover as necessary to protect Caymanian identity in the face of immigration of large numbers of expatriate workers.

Concerns have been expressed that in the long term, the policy may damage the preeminence of the Cayman Islands as an offshore financial centre by making it difficult to recruit and retain experienced staff from onshore financial centres. Government employees are no longer exempt from this "rollover" policy, according to this report in a local newspaper. The governor has used his constitutional powers, which give him absolute control over the disposition of civil service employees, to determine which expatriate civil servants are dismissed after seven years service and which are not.

This policy is incorporated in the Immigration Law (2003 revision), written by the United Democratic Party government, and subsequently enforced by the People's Progressive Movement Party government. Both governments agree to the term limits on foreign workers, and the majority of Caymanians also agree it is necessary to protect local culture and heritage from being eroded by a large number of foreigners gaining residency and citizenship.

CARICOM Single Market Economy
In recognition of the CARICOM (Free Movement) Skilled Persons Act which came into effect in July 1997 in some of the CARICOM countries such as Jamaica and which has been adopted in other CARICOM countries, such as Trinidad and Tobago it is possible that CARICOM nationals who hold the "A Certificate of Recognition of Caribbean Community Skilled Person" will be allowed to work in the Cayman Islands under normal working conditions.

Government 

 
The Cayman Islands are a British overseas territory, listed by the UN Special Committee of 24 as one of the 16 non-self-governing territories. The current Constitution, incorporating a Bill of Rights, was ordained by a statutory instrument of the United Kingdom in 2009. A 19-seat (not including two non-voting members appointed by the Governor which brings the total to 21 members) Parliament is elected by the people every four years to handle domestic affairs. Of the elected Members of the Parliament (MPs), seven are chosen to serve as government Ministers in a Cabinet headed by the Governor. The Premier is appointed by the Governor.

A Governor is appointed by the King of the United Kingdom on the advice of the British Government to represent the monarch. Governors can exercise complete legislative and executive authority if they wish through blanket powers reserved to them in the constitution. Bills which have passed the Parliament require royal assent before becoming effective. The Constitution empowers the Governor to withhold royal assent in cases where the legislation appears to him or her to be repugnant to or inconsistent with the Constitution or affects the rights and privileges of the Parliament or the Royal Prerogative, or matters reserved to the Governor by article 55. The executive authority of the Cayman Islands is vested in the King and is exercised by the Government, consisting of the Governor and the Cabinet. There is an office of the Deputy Governor, who must be a Caymanian and have served in a senior public office. The Deputy Governor is the acting Governor when the office of Governor is vacant, or the Governor is not able to discharge his or her duties or is absent from the Cayman Islands. The current Governor of the Cayman Islands is Martyn Roper.

The Cabinet is composed of two official members and seven elected members, called Ministers; one of whom is designated Premier. The Premier can serve for two consecutive terms after which he or she is barred from attaining the office again. Although an MP can only be Premier twice any person who meets the qualifications and requirements for a seat in the Parliament can be elected to the Parliament indefinitely.

There are two official members of the Parliament, the Deputy Governor and the Attorney General. They are appointed by the Governor in accordance with His Majesty's instructions, and although they have seats in the Parliament, under the 2009 Constitution, they do not vote. They serve in a professional and advisory role to the MPs, the Deputy Governor represents the Governor who is a representative of the King and the British Government. While the Attorney General serves to advise on legal matters and has special responsibilities in Parliament, they are generally responsible for changes to the Penal code.

The seven Ministers are voted into office by the 19 elected members of the Parliament of the Cayman Islands. One of the Ministers, the leader of the majority political party, is appointed Premier by the Governor.

After consulting the Premier, the Governor allocates a portfolio of responsibilities to each Cabinet Minister. Under the principle of collective responsibility, all Ministers are obliged to support in the Parliament any measures approved by Cabinet.

Almost 80 departments, sections and units carry out the business of government, joined by a number of statutory boards and authorities set up for specific purposes, such as the Port Authority, the Civil Aviation Authority, the Immigration Board, the Water Authority, the University College Board of Governors, the National Pensions Board and the Health Insurance Commission.

Since 2000, there have been two official major political parties: The Cayman Democratic Party (CDP) and the People's Progressive Movement (PPM). While there has been a shift to political parties, many contending for office still run as independents. The two parties are notably similar, though they consider each other rivals in most cases, their differences are generally in personality and implementation rather than actual policy. The Cayman Islands generally lacks any form of organised political parties. As of the May 2017 General Election, members of the PPM and CDP have joined with three independent members to form a government coalition despite many years of enmity.

Police

Policing in the country is provided chiefly by the RCIPS or Royal Cayman Islands Police Service and the CICBC or Cayman Islands Customs & Border Control. These two agencies co-operate in aspects of law enforcement, including their joint marine unit.

Military and defence
The defence of the Cayman Islands is the responsibility of the United Kingdom. The Royal Navy maintains a ship on permanent station in the Caribbean (HMS Medway (P223)) and additionally sends another Royal Navy or Royal Fleet Auxiliary ship as a part of Atlantic Patrol (NORTH) tasking. These ships' main mission in the region is to maintain British sovereignty for the overseas territories, provide humanitarian aid and disaster relief during disasters such as hurricanes, which are common in the area, and to conduct counter-narcotic operations.

Cayman Islands Regiment

On 12 October 2019, the government announced the formation of the Cayman Islands Regiment, a new British Armed Forces unit. The Cayman Islands Regiment which became fully operational in 2020, with an initial 35–50 personnel of mostly reservists. Between 2020 through 2021 the Regiment grew to over a hundred personnel and over the next several years expected to grow to over a several hundred personnel.

In mid-December 2019, recruitment for commanding officers and junior officers began, with the commanding officers expected to begin work in January 2020 and the junior officers expected to begin in February 2020.

In January 2020, the first officers were chosen for the Cayman Islands Regiment.

Since the formation of the Regiment, it has been deployed on a few operational tours providing HADR or Humanitarian Aid and Disaster Relief as well as assisting with the COVid19 Pandemic.

Cadet Corps
The Cayman Islands Cadet Corps was formed in March 2001 and carries out military-type training with teenage citizens of the country.

Coast Guard

In 2018, the PPM-led Coalition government pledged to form a coast guard to protect the interests of the Cayman Islands, especially in terms of illegal immigration and illegal drug importation as well as search and rescue. In mid-2018, the Commander and second-in-Command of the Cayman Islands Coast Guard were appointed. Commander Robert Scotland was appointed as the first commanding officer and Lieutenant Commander Leo Anglin was appointed as Second-in-Command.

In mid-2019, the commander and second-in-command took part in international joint operations with the United States Coast Guard and the Jamaica Defense Force Coast Guard called Operation Riptide. This makes it the first deployment for the Cayman Islands Coast Guard and the first in ten years any Cayman Representative has been on a foreign military ship for a counternarcotic operation.

In late November 2019, it was announced that the Cayman Islands Coast Guard would become operational in January 2020, with initial total of 21 Coast Guardsmen half of which would come from the joint marine unit, with further recruitment in the new year. One of the many taskings of the Coast Guard will be to push enforcement of all laws that apply to the designated Wildlife Interaction Zone.

On 5 October 2021, the Cayman Islands Parliament passed the Cayman Islands Coast Guard Act thus establishing the Cayman Islands Coast Guard as a uniformed and disciplined department of Government.

Taxation
No direct taxation is imposed on residents and Cayman Islands companies. The government receives the majority of its income from indirect taxation. Duty is levied against most imported goods, which is typically in the range of 22% to 25%. Some items are exempted, such as baby formula, books, cameras, electric vehicles and certain items are taxed at 5%. Duty on automobiles depends on their value. The duty can amount to 29.5% up to $20,000.00 KYD CIF (cost, insurance and freight) and up to 42% over $30,000.00 KYD CIF for expensive models. The government charges flat licensing fees on financial institutions that operate in the islands and there are work permit fees on foreign labour. A 13% government tax is placed on all tourist accommodations in addition to a US$37.50 airport departure tax which is built into the cost of an airline ticket. There is a 7.5% sales tax on the proceeds of the sale of the property, payable by the purchaser. There are no taxes on corporate profits, capital gains, or personal income. There are no estate or death inheritance taxes payable on Cayman Islands real estate or other assets held in the Cayman Islands.

The legend behind the lack of taxation comes from the Wreck of the Ten Sail, when multiple ships ran aground on the reef off the north coast of Grand Cayman. Local fishermen are said to have then sailed out to rescue the crew and salvage goods from the wrecks. It is said that out of gratitude, and due to their small size, King George III then issued the edict that the citizens of the country of the Cayman Islands would never pay tax. There is, however, no documented evidence for this story besides oral tradition.

Foreign relations

Foreign policy is controlled by the United Kingdom, as the islands remain an overseas territory of the United Kingdom. Although in its early days, the Cayman Islands' most important relationships were with Britain and Jamaica, in recent years, as a result of economic dependence, a relationship with the United States has developed.

Though the Cayman Islands is involved in no major international disputes, they have come under some criticism due to the use of their territory for narcotics trafficking and money laundering. In an attempt to address this, the government entered into the Narcotics Agreement of 1984 and the Mutual Legal Assistance Treaty of 1986 with the United States, to reduce the use of their facilities associated with these activities. In more recent years, they have stepped up the fight against money laundering, by limiting banking secrecy, introducing requirements for customer identification and record keeping, and requiring banks to co-operate with foreign investigators.

Due to their status as an overseas territory of the UK, the Cayman Islands has no separate representation either in the United Nations or in most other international organisations. However, the Cayman Islands still participates in some international organisations, being an associate member of Caricom and UNESCO, and a member of a sub-bureau of Interpol.

Emergency Services 
Access to Emergency Services is available using 9-1-1, the Emergency telephone number, the same number as is used in Canada and the United States. The Cayman Islands Department of Public Safety's Communications Centre processes 9-1-1 and non-emergency Police assistance, Ambulance Service, Fire Service and search and rescue calls for all three islands. The Communications Centre dispatches RCIP and EMS units directly; the Cayman Islands Fire Service maintains their own dispatch room at the airport fire station.

The Police Services are handled by the Royal Cayman Islands Police Service. The Fire Services are handled by the Cayman Islands Fire Service. There are 4 main hospitals in the Cayman Islands, Private and Public Health in the Cayman Islands with various localised health clinics around the islands.

Infrastructure

Ports
George Town is the port capital of Grand Cayman. There are no berthing facilities for cruise ships, but up to four cruise ships can anchor in designated anchorages. There are three cruise terminals in George Town, the North, South, and Royal Watler Terminals. The ride from the ship to the terminal is about 5 minutes.

Airports and airlines
There are three airports which serve the Cayman Islands. The islands' national flag carrier is Cayman Airways, with Owen Roberts International Airport hosting the airline as its hub.

• Owen Roberts International Airport
• Charles Kirkconnell International Airport
• Edward Bodden Airfield

Main Highways
There are three highways, as well as crucial feeder roads that serve the Cayman Islands capital city, George Town. Residents in the east of the city will rely on the East-West Arterial Bypass to go into George Town; as well as Shamrock Road coming from Bodden Town and the eastern districts.
Other main highways and carriageways include:

• Linford Pierson Highway (most popular roadway into George Town from the east)
• Esterly Tibbetts Highway (serves commuters to the north of the city and West Bay)
• North Sound Road (main road for Central George Town)
• South Sound Road (used by commuters to the south of the city)
• Crewe Road (alternative to taking Linford Pierson Highway)

Education

Primary and secondary schools

The Cayman Islands Education Department operates state schools. Caymanian children are entitled to free primary and secondary education. There are two public high schools on Grand Cayman, John Gray High School and Clifton Hunter High School, and one on Cayman Brac, Layman E. Scott High School. Various churches and private foundations operate several private schools.

Colleges and universities
The University College of the Cayman Islands has campuses on Grand Cayman and Cayman Brac and is the only government-run university on the Cayman Islands.

The International College of the Cayman Islands is a private college in Grand Cayman. The college was established in 1970 and offers associate's, bachelor's and master's degree programmes. Grand Cayman is also home to St. Matthew's University, which includes a medical school and a school of veterinary medicine. The Cayman Islands Law School, a branch of the University of Liverpool, is based on Grand Cayman.

The Cayman Islands Civil Service College, a unit of the Cayman Islands government organised under the Portfolio of the Civil Service, is in Grand Cayman. Co-situated with University College of the Cayman Islands, it offers both degree programs and continuing education units of various sorts. The college opened in 2007 and is also used as a government research centre.

There is a University of the West Indies Open campus in the territory.

Sports 

Truman Bodden Sports Complex is a multi-use complex in George Town. The complex is separated into an outdoor, six-lane  swimming pool, full purpose track and field and basketball/netball courts. The field surrounded by the track is used for association football matches as well as other field sports. The track stadium holds 3,000 people.

Association football is the national and most popular sport, with the Cayman Islands national football team representing the Cayman Islands in FIFA.

The Cayman Islands Basketball Federation joined the international basketball governing body FIBA in 1976. The country's national team attended the Caribbean Basketball Championship for the first time in 2011. Cayman Islands National Male National Team has won back 2 back Gold Medal victories in 2017 and 2019 Natwest Island Games.

Rugby union is a developing sport, and has its own national men's team, women's team, and Sevens team. The Cayman Men's Rugby 7s team is second in the region after the 2011 NACRA 7s Championship.

The Cayman Islands are a member of FIFA, the International Olympic Committee and the Pan American Sports Organisation, and also competes in the biennial Island Games.

The Cayman Islands are a member of the International Cricket Council which they joined in 1997 as an Affiliate, before becoming an Associate member in 2002. The Cayman Islands national cricket team represents the islands in international cricket. The team has previously played the sport at first-class, List A and Twenty20 level. It competes in Division Five of the World Cricket League.

Squash is popular in the Cayman Islands with a vibrant community of mostly ex-pats playing out of the 7-court South Sound Squash Club. In addition, the women's professional squash association hosts one of their major events each year in an all-glass court being set up in Camana Bay. In December 2012, the former Cayman Open will be replaced by the Women's World Championships, the largest tournament in the world. The top Cayman men's player, Cameron Stafford is No. 2 in the Caribbean and ranked top 200 on the men's professional circuit.

Flag football (CIFFA) has men's, women's, and mixed-gender leagues.

Other organised sports leagues include softball, beach volleyball, Gaelic football and ultimate frisbee.

The Cayman Islands Olympic Committee was founded in 1973 and was recognised by the IOC (International Olympic Committee) in 1976.

In April 2005 Black Pearl Skate Park was opened in Grand Cayman by Tony Hawk. At the time the  park was the largest in the Western Hemisphere.

In February 2010, the first purpose-built track for kart racing in the Cayman Islands was opened. Corporate karting Leagues at the track have involved widespread participation with 20 local companies and 227 drivers taking part in the 2010 Summer Corporate Karting League.

Cydonie Mothersille was the first track and field athlete from the country to make an Olympic final at the 2008 Olympic Games. She also won a bronze medal in the 200m at the 2001 World Championships in Athletics and gold in the same event at the 2010 Commonwealth Games.

Arts and culture

Music 

The Cayman National Cultural Foundation manages the F.J. Harquail Cultural Centre and the US$4 million Harquail Theatre. The Cayman National Cultural Foundation, established in 1984, helps to preserve and promote Cayman folk music, including the organisation of festivals such as the Cayman Islands International Storytelling Festival, the Cayman JazzFest, Seafarers Festival and Cayfest. The jazz, calypso and reggae genres of music styles feature prominently in Cayman music as celebrated cultural influences.

Art 
The National Gallery of the Cayman Islands is an art museum in George Town. Founded in 1996, NGCI is an arts organisation that seeks to fulfil its mission through exhibitions, artist residencies, education/outreach programmes and research projects in the Cayman Islands. The NGCI is a non-profit institution, part of the Ministry of Health and Culture.

Media 
There are two print newspapers currently in circulation throughout the islands: the Cayman Compass and The Caymanian Times. Online news services include Cayman Compass, Cayman News Service, Cayman Marl Road, The Caymanian Times and Real Cayman News. Olive Hilda Miller was the first paid reporter to work for a Cayman Islands newspaper, beginning her career on the Tradewinds newspaper, which her work helped to establish.

Local radio stations are broadcast throughout the islands.

Feature films that have been filmed in the Cayman Islands include: The Firm, Haven, Cayman Went and Zombie Driftwood.

Television in the Cayman Islands consist of three over-the-air broadcast stations, Trinity Broadcasting Network - CIGTV (the government-owned channel) - Seventh Day Adventist Network. Cable television is available in the Cayman Islands through three providers, C3 Pure Fibre - FLOW TV - Logic TV. Satellite television is provided by Dish Direct TV.

Broadband is widely available on the Cayman Islands, with Digicel, C3 Pure Fibre, FLOW and Logic all providing super fast fibre broadband to the islands.

Notable Caymanians

See also 

Outline of Cayman Islands
 Index of Cayman Islands-related articles

References

Further reading 
 
 
  Originally from the CIA World Factbook 2000.

External links 

 
 Cayman Islands Government
 Cayman Islands Department of Tourism
 
 Cayman Islands Film Commission
 Cayman Islands. The World Factbook. Central Intelligence Agency.
 Cayman Islands from UCB Libraries GovPubs.
 
 Cayman National Cultural Foundation

 
1962 establishments in North America
Island countries
.Cayman
Dependent territories in the Caribbean
English-speaking countries and territories
Former English colonies
Former Spanish colonies
Greater Antilles
States and territories established in 1962
Offshore finance
Tax avoidance
Tax investigation
Corporate tax avoidance